Servigliano is a comune (municipality) in the Province of Fermo in the Italian region Marche, located about  south of Ancona and about  north of Ascoli Piceno.

History 
Servigliano hosts a World War I and II prison camp, the Servigliano prison camp now called "Parco della Pace" (Peace park), an Italian Republic memorial about cruelty and abuse in all wars.
On may 5th , 1944, from this prison camp, 31 jews were deported to Nazi concentration camps, and only 3 of them survived.

Servigliano borders the following municipalities: Belmonte Piceno, Falerone, Monte San Martino, Monteleone di Fermo, Penna San Giovanni, Santa Vittoria in Matenano.

Demographic evolution

References

External links
 www.serviglianoonline.it/

Cities and towns in the Marche